The following highways are numbered 353:

Canada
Manitoba Provincial Road 353
Prince Edward Island Route 353

India
 National Highway 353 (India)

Japan
 Japan National Route 353

United States
  Arkansas Highway 353
  Georgia State Route 353 (former)
  Kentucky Route 353
  Maryland Route 353
  Montana Secondary Highway 353
 New York:
  New York State Route 353
 County Route 353 (Albany County, New York)
  Ohio State Route 353
  Puerto Rico Highway 353
  South Carolina Highway 353
  Tennessee State Route 353
 Texas:
  Texas State Highway 353 (former)
  Texas State Highway Loop 353
  Virginia State Route 353
  Wyoming Highway 353